Sakya Tashi Ling is a monastery belonging to one of four Buddhist schools from Tibet, the Sakyapa tradition. It is an ancient order that follows the Tibetan spiritual leader and ancient king Sakya Trizin. The monastery is ruled by Lama Jamyang Tashi Dorje. It was built in 1905 by a family of Indians, called the Paula Novella which passed into the hands of the Buddist community, Sakya Tashi Ling. They restored the building and installed a museum inside.  It was re-established in July 1996, in the municipality of Olivella in the comarca of Garraf, Barcelona, Catalonia, Spain.

Ten years after its foundation, the community moved into the Plana Novella palace, deep inside the Garraf Natural Park, 40 minutes away from Barcelona. It is not the first Buddhist monastery in Catalonia. The first one is Kagyu Samye Dzong, founded in 1977.

References

External links
 Sakya Tashi Ling Official homepage

Buddhist monasteries in Spain
Buddhist music albums
Monasteries in Catalonia
Religious organizations established in 1996
Tibetan Buddhism in Europe